Trường Đình Trần (1932 – May 6, 2012), a Vietnamese-American, was born in South Vietnam.

Biography
Tran was the principal owner of the Vishipco Line, the largest shipping company in South Vietnam in the 1970s.  As a shipowner, he earned millions of dollars hauling cargo for the United States military. His actions during the last day of the Fall of Saigon have been the subject of debate. Tran states that he used his company's resources, including 24 commercial ships and hundreds of trucks, to aid in the evacuation of thousands of South Vietnamese civilians and military personnel to escape from Vietnam. He let his ships, inclusive the Truong Xuan (with Captain Pham Ngoc Luy) carried free more than 3,000 Vietnamese fleeing Saigon after the Communists invasion.

Tran left Vietnam on April 30, 1975, the day that Saigon fell to the communists. Tran boarded one of his eleven ships and traveled to the United States with two suitcases of gold.

He began his hotel business in New York City, first with the Hotel Opera on the Upper West Side in Manhattan, and then Hotel Carter (with low prices, which was deemed the dirtiest hotel in the US in 2009) in Midtown Manhattan and Hotel Lafayette in Buffalo, New York. Along the way Tran owned and operated other New York hotels as well, including the infamous Hotel Kenmore Hall on 23rd Street which was seized from Tran by the US Marshals Service in 1994 because of deplorable conditions and rampant crime within the building.

After the September 11, 2001 terrorist attacks on the United States he contributed $2 million of his personal funds to the American Red Cross Disaster Relief Fund and in 2003, the Asian American Federation honored his actions. In 1984 during the famine in Ethiopia, he also purchased two helicopters valued at around 3.2 million dollars for the hunger relief organization in Ethiopia. In August 2005, he donated $100,000 to the victims of  Hurricane Katrina.

In May 2004, Tran was awarded a Golden Torch Award, by the Vietnamese American National Gala in Washington, D.C. Mr. Tran was also on the Board of Directors of The United Way of New York City.

References

External links
 Những nghĩa cử đẹp trong biến cố 11/9 (Phỏng vấn bà Nguyễn Kim Sang), RFA 11/9/2011
  Thăm Ông Bà Trần Đình Trường Ở New York 

Hotel Lafayette Photos
http://www.unitedwaynyc.org
 Gia đình giàu nhất Việt Nam có tài sản không "Ảo"

Philanthropists from New York (state)
Vietnamese people of the Vietnam War
American people of Vietnamese descent
Businesspeople from Buffalo, New York
1932 births
2012 deaths
Vietnamese businesspeople
Businesspeople of Vietnamese descent
Vietnamese community activists